was a , built for the Imperial Japanese Navy immediately following the end of World War I. The Minekaze class of destroyers were considered advanced for their time; these ships served as first-line destroyers through the 1930s. The class was considered obsolete by the start of the Pacific War and served in a number of roles including minesweeper, aircraft rescue ships and Kaiten-carriers.

History
Construction of the large-sized Minekaze-class destroyers was authorized as part of the Imperial Japanese Navy's 8-4 Fleet Program (1917–1920) with the first two ships of the class built under the 1917 fiscal programme, followed by five each under the 1918 and 1919 programmes and two ships under the 1920 fiscal programme. The Minekaze-class destroyer was designed to complement the medium-sized , with which they shared many common design characteristics. Equipped with powerful engines, these vessels were capable of high speeds and were intended as escorts for the projected s, which were ultimately never built. Akikaze was built at the Maizuru Naval Arsenal and was the ninth ship of the Minekaze class. She was laid down on 7 June 1920, and launched on 14 December 1920. Completed on 1 April 1921, Akikaze was commissioned on 16 September 1921.

In 1938–1939, the division was assigned to patrols of the central China coastline in support of Japanese combat operations in the Second Sino-Japanese War.

World War II
In World War II, Akikaze performed patrol and convoy escort duties. At the time of the attack on Pearl Harbor, Akikaze (assigned to Destroyer Division 34 of the IJN 11th Air Fleet) was based at Takao, and provided air sea rescue support for the "Operation M" (the Japanese invasion of the Philippines), and escort of convoys to Davao and Legazpi.

From January to the end of April 1942, Akikaze was based at Davao, escorting shipping between Davao and Ambon. After a brief return to Maizuru for repairs in May 1942, Akikaze was based out of Rabaul, escorting transports throughout the Pacific. On 14 March 1943, Akikaze and two other destroyers attacked a submarine — possibly  — near Kairiru Island .<ref>CombinedFleet.com says 14 March, but the Dictionary of American Naval Fighting Ships says,

<blockquote>On 15 March, Trigger reported that she had attacked a convoy and had been depth charged. Even though attacks on her ceased, she could still hear distant depth charging for about an hour. No further messages from Triton were ever received. Post-war examination of Japanese records revealed that on 15 March 1943 three Japanese destroyers attacked a submarine a little northwest of Triton'''s assigned area and subsequently observed an oil slick, debris, and items with American markings.</blockquote> Maybe Akikaze made two attacks on Triton, on both the 14th and 15th?</ref>

On 18 March 1943 Akikaze was the scene of a war crime. During construction of a seaplane base at Kairiru Island Akikaze evacuated the personnel of the Roman Catholic mission headquarters on that island and also several individuals from Wewak. These included Bishop Joseph Loerks, 38 missionaries (31 of whom were German nationals) including 18 nuns, one New Guinea girl, and two Chinese infants (apparently the children of Wewak storekeeper Ning Hee). The vessel then called at Manus where it picked up 20 others, again mostly Germans, including six missionaries from the Liebenzell Evangelical Mission, three other nuns and three other priests, a European infant, a plantation owner named Carl Muster and plantation overseer Peter Mathies, two Chinese, and apparently four Malays. The ostensible intention was to carry them to internment in Rabaul. "Between Manus and Rabaul each of the adults was strung up by the hands on a gallows in the stern of the vessel, shot dead by rifle or machine-gun fire, and thrown overboard. The two Chinese infants and the European baby were thrown over alive." As there were U.S. nationals among the victims, the Australian War Crimes Section in Tokyo, having completed its investigation, on 18 July 1947 handed the matter over to the American authorities, who appear to have taken no further action.

After repairs again at Maizuru in April 1943, Akikaze returned to Rabaul to resume her escort and patrol duties. She was heavily damaged in an air raid on 2 August, with 23 casualties and forced to return to Maizuru for repairs again in September. Returning to Rabaul again in mid-November, she made several "Tokyo Express" troop transport runs to New Guinea from October 1943-February 1944. In March, she was reassigned to Truk, where she provided escort for convoys between Truk, Saipan and Palau. On 1 May 1944, Akikaze was reassigned to Destroyer Division 30 of the Central Pacific Fleet. After escorting a convoy from Japan to Davao and Manila, she was based at Manila. However, Destroyer Division 30 was reassigned to the Combined Fleet on 20 August.

On 24–25 October, Akikaze led the escort for the 2nd Supply Force of Admiral Ozawa's Northern Force at the Battle of Leyte Gulf, rescuing survivors from the torpedoed fleet oiler Jinei Maru, and taking them to Mako.

On 1 November, Destroyer Division 30 —  (flagship), and Akikaze — departed Mako, escorting aircraft carrier  and cruiser  toward Brunei. On 3 November, the submarine  fired a spread of torpedoes at Jun'yō, but Akikaze intercepted them, sacrificing herself to save the carrier.

On 10 January 1945, Akikaze was struck from the Navy List.

Notes

References
 Ralph M. Wiltgen: The Death of Bishop Loerks and his companions, Part I: The Execution, in: Verbum SVD 6:4 (1964) 363–397.
 R. Wiltgen: The Death of Bishop Loerks and his companions, Part II: The Trial, in: Verbum SVD 7:1 (1965) 14–44.
 R. Wiltgen: Aposteltod in Neuguinea. Der Tod des Bischofs Lörks u. seiner Gefährten, Steyler Verl., St. Augustin 1966. 75 S.
 
 
 
 
 
 
 Theo Aerts, (ed): The martyrs of Papua New Guinea: 333 missionary lives lost during World War II . University of Papua New Guinea Press, Port Moresby, 1994, 276 pp., 
In the movie Run Silent, Run Deep, the US submarine Nerka attacks and sinks a Japanese destroyer called  Akikaze in the Bungo Strait.  The Akikaze'' was thought to have destroyed four US submarines and was particularly adept in this role while protecting convoys.

External links
 
 
 
 

Minekaze-class destroyers
Ships built by Mitsubishi Heavy Industries
1920 ships
Second Sino-Japanese War naval ships of Japan
World War II destroyers of Japan
Ships sunk by American submarines
World War II shipwrecks in the South China Sea
Maritime incidents in November 1944
Ships lost with all hands
Japanese hell ships